Choaib Belhaj Salah (born June 4, 1987) is a Tunisian Olympic volleyball player.

References 

Tunisian beach volleyball players
Olympic beach volleyball players of Tunisia
Beach volleyball players at the 2016 Summer Olympics
1987 births
Living people
Competitors at the 2019 African Games
African Games competitors for Tunisia